The Institut Néerlandais (1957–2013) was a non-profit institution in Paris devoted to the promotion of Dutch art and culture. One of the earliest foreign cultural centers in Paris, it was founded in 1957 by Frits Lugt. The Dutch Ministry of Foreign Affairs, the sole financier of the center announced its closure in 2013. It closed in December 2013.
Located at 121 rue de Lille, it occupied the Hôtel Turgot, an 18th-century mansion.

The owner of the building, another foundation started by Frits Lugt, adjoins and currently uses the building as a gallery for the collection of the Fondation Custodia.

See also
 List of foreign cultural institutes in Paris

References

External links
 Website van het Institut Néerlandais

1957 establishments in France
2013 disestablishments in France
Cultural centers
Cultural venues in Paris
Dutch culture